

History 
Karuwali (also known as Garuwali, Dieri) is a language of far western Queensland. The Karuwali language region includes the landscape within the local government boundaries of the Diamantina Shire Council, including the localities of Betoota and Haddon Corner.

Connemara Station also often spelled as Connemarra Station is a pastoral lease that currently operates as a cattle station in Queensland.

The property is situated approximately 95 kilometres west of Stonehenge. The ephemeral Farrar's Creek runs through the property.

The lease was first taken up by pioneer and pastoralist John Costello in the late 1860s.
By 1877 Connemara was owned by De Burgh Persee who was running cattle. In 1881 Connemara sold for £21,000 and was stocked with 3,000 head of cattle.

In 1933 the homestead was completely destroyed by fire. The manager, S. G. Kerr, lost everything in the fire. At this time Connemarra was owned by Allison and Wigan. When put up for auction in 1937 when stocked with 9.235 head of cattle the property attracted no bids and was passed in. The trustees of the estate of J. B. Allison sold the station in 1938 to B. K. Reid.

The North Australian Pastoral Company acquired the property in 1986 and sold it in 2007.

See also
List of ranches and stations

References

Stations (Australian agriculture)
Pastoral leases in Queensland
South West Queensland